Olivia Porter may refer to:

 Olivia Sophie L'Ange Shipp (1880–1980), also known as Olivia Porter, multi-instrumentalist
 Olivia Porter (cricketer) (born 2001), Australian cricketer
 Olivia Porter, daughter of John Boteler, 1st Baron Boteler of Bramfield, subject of a portrait by Anthony van Dyck